Phellopsis obcordata is a beetle of the Family Zopheridae.

Zopheridae
Beetles described in 1873